Chittenden Lyon (February 22, 1787 – November 23, 1842) was an American businessman and politician from Kentucky. He was most notable for his service as a United States representative from 1827 to 1833.

Biography
Chittenden Lyon was born in Fair Haven, Vermont on February 22, 1787, the son of Matthew Lyon and Beulah (Chittenden) Lyon. Beulah Lyon was the daughter of Governor Thomas Chittenden and the sister of Governor Martin Chittenden. Chittenden Lyon attended the common schools of Fair Haven before the Lyon family moved to Kentucky in 1801. The Lyons settled in Caldwell County, Kentucky, and after completing his education, Lyon became a successful merchant and farmer in Eddyville. He owned slaves. According to descriptions by his contemporaries, Lyon was a "giant," well over six feet tall and nearly 350 pounds.

As a Democratic-Republican, Lyon was a member of the Kentucky House of Representatives from 1822 to 1825. In 1826, Lyon was elected to the United States House of Representatives as a Jacksonian. He was reelected three times, and served from March 4, 1827 to March 3, 1835. He was not a candidate for reelection in 1834, and returned to his business and farming interests. Lyon died in Eddyville, on November 23, 1842 and was buried in Eddyville Cemetery. In 1842, he had been elected to the Kentucky House of Representatives, but he died before the start of the term and never took his seat.

Family
In 1817, Lyon married Nancy Vaughn (1796–1828). In 1829, he married Frances (Baker) Jones (1802–1866). With her first husband, Frances Lyon was the mother of Edmund W. Jones (1822–1853).

With his first wife, Lyon was the father of:

Mary Ann (1818–1873)
Margaret Aurelia (b. 1820)
Matthew Skinner (1823–1891)
Giles James Nelson (b. 1825)
Chittenden Patton (1827–1863)

With Frances Baker, Lyon was the father of:

Helen Minerva (1830–1880)
Loraine Elvira (1831–1840)
Thompson Archer (1833–1899)

Margaret Lyon was the first wife of U.S. Senator Willis Benson Machen.

Legacy
Lyon County, Kentucky which was separated from Caldwell County, Kentucky in 1854, was named in his honor.

References

External links

Chittenden Lyon Letters

1787 births
1842 deaths
People from Fair Haven, Vermont
Chittenden family
American people of Irish descent
Jacksonian members of the United States House of Representatives from Kentucky
Members of the Kentucky House of Representatives
Kentucky state senators
American slave owners
People from Lyon County, Kentucky
Elected officials who died without taking their seats